Great Nicobar is the southernmost and largest of the Nicobar Islands of India, north of Sumatra.

History
The Nicobar Island has been well known to Indian mariners since the time of the seafaring Cholas.

In the 15th century, Great Nicobar Island was recorded as "Cui Lan island" (翠蘭嶼) during the voyages of Zheng He in the Mao Kun map of the Wu Bei Zhi.

Great Nicobar Island was severely affected by the 2004 Indian Ocean earthquake tsunami with many deaths, and was cut off from all outside contact for more than a day.

Geography
The island covers 
but is sparsely inhabited, with a population of 8067, largely being covered by rainforest and known for its diverse wildlife.

Topography 
The island has several rivers, including the Alexandra, Amrit Kaur, Dogmar and Galathea. Virtually all rivers flow in a southern or southwesterly direction, which is indicative of the general slope of the terrain across the island. There are undulating hills throughout the island, with the main range running in a north-south orientation. Mount Thullier, which is part of this range, has the highest elevation of any point in the Nicobars, at 642 m above sea level.

Indira Point (6°45’10″N and 93°49’36″E) is the southernmost point of the Great Nicobar Island and India itself. Indira Point subsided 4.25 m in the 26 December 2004 tsunami and the lighthouse there was damaged. The lighthouse was subsequently made functional.

Ecology 
The island is part of the Nicobar Islands rain forests ecoregion. Plant communities include mangroves and coastal forests near the seashore, and evergreen and deciduous forests in the interior.

The majority of the island is designated as the Great Nicobar Biosphere Reserve— home to many unique and endemic species of plants and animals including the Nicobar scrubfowl (Megapodius nicobariensis, a megapode bird), the edible-nest swiftlet (Aerodramus fuciphagus), the Nicobar long-tailed macaque (Macaca fascicularis umbrosa), saltwater crocodile (Crocodylus porosus), giant leatherback sea turtle (Dermochelys coriacea), Malayan box turtle, Nicobar tree shrew, reticulated python (Python reticulatus) and the giant robber crab (or coconut crab, Birgus latro).

Demography
The island is home to the Shompen people.

Transportation 
There is a 915m airstrip at Campbell Bay/Tenlaa on the East coast.
 Seaport: At least one small shipping dock is located in Campbell Bay.

Naval air station

The INS Baaz naval air station, near Campbell Bay, is under the joint-services Andaman and Nicobar Command (ANC) of the Indian Armed Forces. It is the southernmost air station of the Indian Armed Forces.

Great Nicobar Development Plan 
The Great Nicobar Development Plan is a massive infrastructure plan (including a major transshipment port, airport, and future strategic defense) for the southern tip of Great Nicobar Island, India. The plan has generated conflict concerning consequences of deforestation and giant leatherback sea turtle nesting sites. The plan was proposed on January 18, 2021 by an Indian policy think tank (NITI Aayog) informed by a feasibility report written by AECOM India Private Limited. Environmental Justice groups have pushed back claiming that the development plan would make it unlikely that the leatherback sea turtles would continue to nest in the Galathea Bay - as well as negatively impact the nomadic livelihoods of the indigenous Shompen people. The NITI Aayog plan also envisages 650,000 people to inhabit the island by 2050. Its current population is only around 8,500. In fact, the total population of the archipelago, composed of over 500 islands but of which around 40 are inhabited, is around 380,000. The increase in population is expected to impose a significant ecological pressure on the island and its surroundings.

Indira Point

Indira Point is the name of the southernmost point of Republic of India. It is situated on Great Nicobar Island in the Nicobar Islands, which are located in the eastern Indian Ocean at 6°45’10″N and 93°49’36″E. This is not on the Indian mainland, but within the Union Territory of Andaman and Nicobar Islands. The name of the point was changed from Pygmalion Point on 18 October 1985 in commemoration of Indira Gandhi. It was formerly known by various names that include Pygmalion Point, Parsons Point, and for a brief period India Point.

It is located 540 km and more than a day's sea voyage from Port Blair, the capital city and main port of the Andaman and Nicobar Islands. It is approximately 163 km by sea from Sumatra, Indonesia. Rondo Island, Indonesia's northernmost island in Sabang district of Aceh province of Sumatra, lies south of Indira point. India and Indonesia are planning to collaborate to construct a port at Sabang to protect the channel between Great Nicobar Island and Rondo Island (c. May 2019).

Indira Point lighthouse
Indira Point has a 35 m high cast iron (with red and white bands) lighthouse with 16 nautical miles range. The lighthouse has (RACON (Code 'G') ii DGPS station) with a 300 mm 4 panel revolving light inside a 2.5 m diameter lantern house (BBT). It is an important landmark on the international shipping lane Colombo-Singapore route via Malacca Strait that passes south of Indira Point. It also has a helipad.

2004 tsunami
The tsunami which resulted from the Indian Ocean earthquake of 2004 inundated much of the area. This partly damaged the lighthouse, which subsided 4.25 m. As a result of this subsidence, the coast retreated and the sea moved permanently inland. The lighthouse has since been repaired.

The base of the lighthouse was 5 m above sea level when constructed in 1972. After the tsunami, the sea rose and the base was less than a metre above the sea level, showing over 4 meters of sea floor subsidence. It has been observed that the sea is slowly retreating back to its original position and the subsidence has decreased as the ocean floor slowly bounces back partially, a similar drop and rise due to crustal decompression and recompression was observed in the 2011 Tōhoku earthquake and tsunami on Honshu. Indira point was mostly submerged.

See also 

 Andaman Sea
 List of extreme points of India
 Extreme points of Indonesia

Image gallery

References 

"Nicobar completely devastated" – from rediff.com
2001 Census – from the Andaman & Nicobar Police
Great Nicobar Biosphere Reserve

 
Islands of the Andaman and Nicobar Islands
Nicobar district
Tehsils of the Andaman and Nicobar Islands